Afewerki, Afwerki or Afewerk is an Eritrean name that may refer to

 Afewerk Tekle (1932–2012), Ethiopian painter on African and Christian themes, stained glass artist
 Abraham Afewerki (1966–2006), Eritrean singer
Elyas Afewerki (born 1992), Eritrean cyclist
 Isaias Afwerki (born 1946), President of Eritrea

Ethiopian given names